Vladislav Igorevich Parshikov (born 19 February 1996) is a Russian football player.

Club career
He made his professional debut in the Russian Professional Football League for FC Chertanovo Moscow on 14 July 2014 in a game against FC Metallurg Lipetsk. He made his Russian Football National League debut for Chertanovo on 17 July 2018 in a game against FC Rotor Volgograd.

International
He won the 2013 UEFA European Under-17 Championship with Russia.

References

External links
 
 

1996 births
Footballers from Voronezh
Living people
Russian footballers
Russia youth international footballers
Russia under-21 international footballers
Association football midfielders
FC Chertanovo Moscow players
FC Fakel Voronezh players